Saint Johns Range is a crescent-shaped mountain range about  long, in Victoria Land. It is bounded on the north by the Cotton, Miller and Debenham Glaciers, and on the south by Victoria Valley and the Victoria Upper and Victoria Lower Glaciers. Its eastern end is formed by a spur called Lizards Foot. Named by the New Zealand Northern Survey Party of the Commonwealth Trans-Antarctic Expedition, 1956–58, which surveyed peaks in the range in 1957. Named for St. John's College at Cambridge, England, with which several members of the British Antarctic Expedition (1910–13) were associated during the writing of their scientific reports, and in association with the adjacent Gonville and Caius Range.

Kuivinen Ridge
Kuivinen Ridge is a transverse ridge extending southwest–northeast across the Saint Johns Range between an unnamed glacier and the Ringer Glacier in Victoria Land. It was named by the Advisory Committee on Antarctic Names in 2005 after ice coring specialist Karl C. Kuivinen, University of Nebraska-Lincoln (UNL), 1974–2003; Field Operations Manager, Ross Ice Shelf Project Management Office, UNL, for the 1974–1978 season; Director, Polar Ice Coring Office, UNL, 1979-1989 and 1994–2001; 15 summer field seasons in Antarctica, between 1968 and 2000; and 24 summer field seasons in Greenland and Alaska between 1974 and 1999.

Lobeck Glacier
Lobeck Glacier is a glacier flowing northeast between Rutherford Ridge and Kuivinen Ridge in the Saint Johns Range of Victoria Land. Named by the Advisory Committee on Antarctic Names in 2007 after the noted American geographer-geologist Armin K. Lobeck (1886-1958), Professor of Geology, Columbia University, from 1929 to 1954; He was the author of the textbook Geomorphology, widely used in training geomorphologists active in Antarctica.

Rutherford Ridge

It was named by the Advisory Committee on Antarctic Names in 2007 after Ernest Rutherford, 1st Baron of Nelson and Cambridge (1871-1937), a winner of the Nobel Prize in Chemistry for 1908. His researches in radiation and atomic structure were basic to the later 20th-century developments in nuclear physics. In 1997 the International Union of Pure and Applied Chemistry (IUPAC) formally designated the name Rutherfordium for the new chemical element with the atomic number 104.

References

Mountain ranges of Victoria Land
McMurdo Dry Valleys